Tremolo E.P. is an extended play by Irish-English alternative rock band My Bloody Valentine, released in February 1991 by Creation Records. The EP was a critical success and topped the UK Indie Chart. It featured the single "To Here Knows When", which subsequently appeared (in a different mix) on the band's second album Loveless.

Background
The EP featured the band more heavily utilising samplers, which allowed them to play back sounds on keyboard. Sampled sounds include guitar feedback, vocals, a BBC stock sound effects recording to create a low-end effect on "To Here Knows When", and a Turkish belly dancing track ripped from cassette on the track "Swallow". The title is a reference to the band's heavy usage of guitar tremolo and vibrato to create blurred, dreamlike tones (Kevin Shields' method of strumming chords while simultaneously bending his guitar's tremolo/whammy bar was referred to as "glide guitar").

In November 1991, Shields commented: "Tremolo had seven tracks on it, but you're not allowed to do that, so we called it four tracks and didn't name three of them. People just thought they were weird bits!" The lead track, "To Here Knows When", has a longer and more ethereal coda—essentially constituting a separate song—than the version later included on the album Loveless. "Swallow" and "Honey Power" also each contain an instrumental coda. All three segues/codas feature backwards guitar loops and heavy reverb.

Videos were filmed for the songs "Swallow" and "To Here Knows When" under the direction of Angus Cameron.

Track listing

Also issued as a CD (CRESCD085)

Personnel
My Bloody Valentine
Bilinda Butcher – guitar, vocals
Colm Ó Cíosóig – drums, Roland Octapad on "Moon Song"
Debbie Googe – bass guitar
Kevin Shields – guitar, vocals, sampler

Technical personnel
Alan Moulder – engineering
My Bloody Valentine – production
Designland – design
Sam Harris – photographer

References

My Bloody Valentine (band) EPs
1991 EPs
Creation Records EPs

it:Tremolo#Musica